Parantica aglea, the glassy tiger, is a butterfly found in Indomalayan realm that belongs to the crows and tigers, that is, the danaid group of the brush-footed butterflies family.

Description
Two subspecies are recognized but neither form is constant either in markings or in habitat. In the British Museum collection there are specimens of true Parantica aglea aglea from Myanmar, and others, inseparable from typical Parantica aglea melanoides, from Mysore.

Subspecies Parantica aglea aglea
Ground colour fuliginous black with subhyaline bluish-white streaks and spots. Forewing: vein 11 anastomosed with vein 12.

Upperside: forewing—interspace 1 with two comparatively long, broad streaks united at base, truncate exteriorly; cell with a very broad, somewhat clavate streak traversed by two fine black lines; basal spots in interspaces 2 and 3; an irregular discal series of three spots and two elongate streaks and a subterminal series of spots, the two series curved inwards opposite apex of wing, the latter continued along the apical half of the

costa; finally a terminal row in pairs in the interspaces, of much smaller spots. Hindwing: interspaces la, lb with broad long streaks from base; interspace 1 and cell with two streaks united at base in each, the pair in the cell with a short streak obliquely between their apices, an outwardly radiating series of broad, elongate, inwardly pointed spots in interspaces 2–8, followed by somewhat irregular rows of subterminal and terminal spots. Underside similar, the markings and spots sometimes a little ill-defined and blurred.

Antennae black; head and thorax black spotted with white; abdomen blackish brown, ochraceous beneath.
Male secondary sex-mark in form 2.

Subspecies Parantica aglea melanoides

Northern and eastern form. Differs as follows: Wings on the whole longer and narrower; hyaline markings, especially in interspace 1 of forewing and in cells of both forewing and hindwing, very much broader. In many specimens the black ground colour in these spaces is reduced to a mere slender black line enclosed in the subhyaline marking. On the underside the streaks are often much blurred and diffuse.

Wingspan 70–100 mm.

Distribution
Subspecies Parantica aglea aglea: Sri Lanka, the Western Ghats north to Pune and the Niligiris.
Subspecies Parantica aglea melanoides: the Himalayas from Kashmir to Nepal; Sylhet; Assam; Cachar; Chittagong; Arrakan; Burma and Tenasserim.

Life cycle

Food plants

 Tylophora carnosa
 Tylophora pauciflora

Eggs

White pearl-shaped eggs are laid under the leaves. They hatch after about three days.

Larva
Dark claret brown, two round chrome-yellow spots on each segment, with scattered smaller bluish-white spots between, clustering into and forming a conspicuous line along the sides; legs and ventral surface purplish black, the tentacula, placed as usual on the 3rd and 12th segments, claret brown.

Pupa
Green, spotted with silver , black and gold; much constricted behind the thorax.

Range
Western Ghats, north-east India , Sri Lanka and Malay peninsula.

See also
Danainae
Nymphalidae
List of butterflies of India
List of butterflies of India (Nymphalidae)

References

External links

Sri Lanka Wild Life Information Database

A
Butterflies of Asia
Butterflies of Indochina
Insects of Myanmar
Lepidoptera of Nepal
Butterflies of Sri Lanka
Taxa named by Caspar Stoll
Butterflies described in 1782